Sun and Steel is the sixth and final studio album, released by Iron Butterfly in 1975. It explores a wider variety of styles than any other Iron Butterfly album, yet always remains within the contemporary conventions of hard rock. Tracks from this album are usually left out of Iron Butterfly compilations/greatest hit collections.

Reception

Allmusic's Stephen Thomas Erlewine delivered a negative review of Sun and Steel, rating it one out of five stars. He said it "was an outright disastrous attempt at reshaping the band's signature sound to '70s hard rock conventions, lacking even the curiosity value of Scorching Beauty."

George Starostin's Only Solitaire page gave a positive review of the album, rating it eleven out of fifteen. He said that "This is the best Iron Butterfly album I've heard so far" and that "as I'm not a fan of the 'heavy soul' genre, I have to admit the band worked some mini-wonders on here", singling out "Scorching Beauty" as the best track.

Track listing

Personnel
Iron Butterfly
Erik Brann – guitars, lead vocals
Ron Bushy – drums
Bill DeMartines – keyboards, vocals
Philip Taylor Kramer – bass, vocals

Additional personnel
David Richard Campbell – orchestration on "Beyond the Milky Way" and "I'm Right, I'm Wrong"
Jerome Jumonville – horns on "Beyond the Milky Way" and "Free"
Alex Quigley – Marimba on "Free"
Julia Tillman, Maxine Willard, and June Deniece Williams – backing vocals on "Free"

Singles
 "Beyond the Milky Way" b/w "Get It Out"
 "I'm Right, I'm Wrong" (3:50 edit) b/w "Scion" (3:40 edit)

References

Iron Butterfly albums
1975 albums
MCA Records albums
Albums arranged by David Campbell (composer)